The BWF Super Series Finals (named as BWF Super Series Masters Finals until 2009) was an annual badminton tournament held at the end of the year where the players with the most points from that calendar year's twelve events of the BWF Super Series competed for total prize money of at least US$ 1,000,000. It was replaced by BWF World Tour Finals in 2018.

History
The Super Series Finals were cancelled in 2007 due to the lack of sponsorship for this tournament. The 2008 tournament – known at the time as the BWF Super Series Masters Finals 2008 – was the first edition and it was held in Kota Kinabalu, Sabah, Malaysia on December 18 to December 21, 2008.

Only the top eight players or pairs in the Super Series rankings after the final Super Series tournament, as announced by the Badminton World Federation, were eligible to participate; however it was limited to two entries per member association. In the tournament, eight players or pairs would be divided into two groups of four, with the top two players or pairs advanced to the semi-finals.

For the 2010 edition finals, the competition was held in January 2011. In 2014, the total prize money doubled to US$1 million. Dubai, United Arab Emirates was the venue for the Super Series Finals until 2017 as the result of Badminton World Federation partnership.

Winners

Performances by nation

See also
 World Badminton Grand Prix Finals
 BWF World Tour Finals

References

 
Final
2007 establishments
2017 disestablishments
Defunct sports competitions